Garra rossica is a species of ray-finned fish in the genus Garra from eastern Iran, Afghanistan and Pakistan.

References 

Garra
Fish described in 1900
Taxa named by Alexander Nikolsky